Oakfield Preparatory School is an independent coeducational preparatory school in West Dulwich, Lambeth. in the United kingdom

Oakfield is a member of the Independent Schools Association. With over 350 boys and girls aged between 2 and 11, it is housed in historic Georgian buildings each side of the South Circular at the junction with Croxted Road.

For many years a senior school was run from the building on the south side of the road under the name of John Wycliffe Prep School, for 11-16 year olds.

World War II
Pupils were evacuated during World War II because of the threat of bombing.

Notable alumni
 Derek Abbott, scientist and engineer
 Michael Smith (Michael Crawford), actor and singer
 Kim Smith (Kim Wilde), singer and daughter of 1960s pop star Marty Wilde
 Dame Norma Wagstaff Major, wife of former British Prime Minister John Major

References

External links
 Oakfield School website

Dulwich
Educational institutions established in 1888
Private co-educational schools in London
Private schools in the London Borough of Lambeth
Member schools of the Independent Schools Association (UK)
Preparatory schools in London
1888 establishments in England